Atheist Alliance International (AAI) is a non-profit advocacy organization committed to raising awareness and educating the public about atheism. It does this by supporting atheist and freethought organizations around the world through promoting local campaigns, raising awareness of related issues, sponsoring secular education projects and facilitating interaction among secular groups and individuals.

History 

AAI was founded in 1991 as Atheist Alliance, an alliance of four U.S.-based local atheist groups. Over time Atheist Alliance expanded, adding both local/regional U.S. groups and international groups as members. The organization changed its name to Atheist Alliance International in 2001. In 2010 and 2011 members approved the separation of the U.S. and international segments of AAI into separate organizations in order to accommodate the different strategic interests of each group. The U.S. group of AAI was renamed Atheist Alliance of America. The launch of the newly restructured AAI occurred at the World Atheist Convention in Dublin, Ireland on 3 June 2011. AAI then described the organisation as follows:Atheist Alliance International (AAI) is a global network of atheist and freethought groups and individuals, committed to educating its members and the public about atheism, secularism and related issues.

A positive global voice for atheism and secularism, AAl:

 Strengthens cooperation between atheist and freethought organisations around the world;
 Supports the establishment of new atheist/freethought organisations, particularly in developing countries; and
 Facilitates and supports projects/events that promote atheism, critical thinking and empiricism, while combating discrimination against atheists and freethinkers around the world.In 2013, AAI was granted special consultative status by the United Nations. 

In February 2018, AAI was granted participatory status at the Council of Europe.

During 2017-2018, a small number of directors placed AAI into what they called "Special Measures", without the knowledge of other directors, or any of the members.

On 20 May 2018 a "Directors Annual General Meeting" was held, without the knowledge of most of the members. At that AGM, new bylaws were introduced which, among other things:

 Removed the requirement for the board to hold Annual General Meetings.
 Removed the ability of members to nominate or elect directors, or (in the absence of AGMs) to propose or vote on any other motions.
 Removed the requirement for the board to publish annual accounts to the members.

In 2020, the Attorney General of California revoked AAI's Charity status.

In 2022, AAI's participatory status at the Council of Europe was revoked.

Organization structure 
AAI's Board consists of between 4 and 13 Directors elected for two-year staggered terms. Affiliates or individual members can propose candidates for the Board, and the annual general meeting votes on them and elects directors.

As of the May 2022 Annual General Meeting, the current leadership includes:

Executive Committee
 President & UN Representative - David Orenstein (USA) (resigned in June 2022)
 Vice President - Nina Sankari (Poland) (resigned in June 2022)
 Secretary - Bill Flavell (UK)
 Treasurer - Fotis Frangopoulos (Greece)

Regional Directors
 Africa - Ebuka Ikeorah (Nigeria)
 Asia - Tonoy Emroz Alam (Bangladesh/Germany); & Atheist Support Network Director
 Australasia - Stella Thomas (Australia)
 Europe - Kristina Hallmeier (Germany)
 North America - Jamila Bey (USA) (resigned in October 2022)
 South America - Shirley Rivera (resigned in May 2022)

Board Members At-Large
 Jason Sylvester (Canada, pan-Asia), Director (AAI Blogging, Podcast Host)
 Brian Kernick (Canada)
 Steve Polgar (USA)

Projects 

AAI assists Kasese School in Western Uganda. This is a humanist school that provides secular education in a remote area of the country. AAI's education policy supports the right to secular education, and asserts the need for education in critical thinking and the distinction between faith and reason as a guide to knowledge beliefs along with the spirit of free inquiry and the teaching of science free from religious interference and the respect for evidence. AAI is opposed to indoctrination and dogma—religious or otherwise.

The organization has a flagship publication called Secular World which is published quarterly. Members also receive AAI Insider, a fortnightly newsletter.

UN submissions 

 In September 2016 Atheist Alliance International made a submission to the United Nations Human Rights Council in which they criticised the Blasphemy law in the Republic of Ireland. Following a referendum in 2018, this constitutional requirement was removed by the Thirty-seventh Amendment of the Constitution of Ireland.
 In June 2019 the United Nations Economic and Social Council circulated a submission from Atheist Alliance International titled "Empowering People and Ensuring Inclusiveness and Equality for Non-Believers".
 In January 2020 a written submission was made to the United Nations Human Rights Council (UNHRC) as part of AAI's "Right to be Secular" campaign. This was followed by a video submission to the UNHRC in March 2021.The video from AAI was not played in the UN session for which it was submitted, and this submission has never been made public by AAI. Atheist Ireland subsequently clarified that there is already "an established internationally recognised human right to be atheist, agnostic, secular, humanist, or in any other way free from religion."

Governance issues 
In 2020, the status of AAI as a registered nonprofit was suspended, and has since been revoked. This means that AAI “may not operate or solicit donations in California”, where AAI was registered.

When the then President, David Orenstein, resigned in June 2022, AAI's announcement of the resignation included this quote from Orenstein: "When I accepted the role of President on May 22, I was aware of the governance issue [sic] that have been raised. I believed, and still believe, the allegations can be tackled head-on."

In a public announcement in June 2022, the then Vice President Nina Sankari stated "A few days ago, after obtaining information about the disastrous legal status of the AAI ..., I submitted my resignation from the role of Vice President of AAI and of its board member [sic], seeing no further possibility of acting within its framework."

Voting issues 
Some AAI members have complained that the board has used the ambiguous concept of "formal" membership to arbitrarily deny voting rights to member organisations. In 2021 the Greek Helsinki Monitor published an article claiming that, during the Annual General Meeting of AAI that year, there was a "denial of the right to vote of our Humanist Union of Greece", in contravention of the bylaws. Following the 2022 AGM, the spokesperson at the Greek Helsinki Monitor revealed that, once again, the Humanist Union of Greece had been denied voting rights at the AGM, despite being assured by the AAI Secretary/Treasurer that they were "a member in good standing" after paying their annual membership fee two months earlier.

AAI in the media 

 The Washington Post - "Atheists rally for persecuted unbeliever in Indonesia"
 National Geographic - "The World's Newest Major Religion: No Religion"
 Da Ali G Show. Featuring the then President of AAI, Bobbie Kirkhart.
 Gript - "Atheists Behaving Badly: The Lamentable State Of Contemporary Godlessness"
 Adlington43 - "Getting The Cabal Together"

See also
 Humanists International

References

External links 

Atheist Alliance of America website
European Atheists Alliance website

Atheist organizations
Organizations established in 1991
1991 establishments in the United States
Non-profit organizations based in Washington, D.C.
Skeptic organizations in the United States

ko:AAI